Remo Forrer (born 8 September 2001) is a Swiss singer. He won the third season of the TV talent show The Voice of Switzerland in April 2020, and also participated in the German TV talent show I Can See Your Voice. He is set to represent Switzerland in the Eurovision Song Contest 2023 with the song "Watergun".

Career

2019–2022: The Voice of Switzerland and I Can See Your Voice 
In November 2019, Forrer auditioned for the third season of The Voice of Switzerland with the song "Someone You Loved" by Lewis Capaldi. He received chair turns from all four coaches and joined Noah Veraguth's team. Forrer won the season on 6 April 2020.

2023: Eurovision Song Contest 
On 20 February 2023, Remo Forrer was announced as the Swiss representative for the Eurovision Song Contest 2023 by Swiss broadcaster SRG. His competing song, "Watergun", was released on 7 March.

Personal life 
Remo Forrer lives in Hemberg, in the canton of St. Gallen. He has had an interest in music since his early childhood, which lead to him learning to play the flute, the accordion and eventually the piano, which he taught himself to play by ear. He completed an internship as a retail specialist in a sporting goods store.

References 

Living people
2001 births
21st-century Swiss male singers
The Voice (franchise) winners
Eurovision Song Contest entrants of 2023
Eurovision Song Contest entrants for Switzerland